Moledet (lit. Homeland) is a moshav shitufi in northern Israel. Located in the Lower Galilee, it falls under the jurisdiction of Gilboa Regional Council.

History
The community was founded as a 'Moshav Shitufi' (collective settlement - a combination of a kibbutz and a Moshav) on 4 July 1937 as part of the Tower and stockade program, and was named after the "Moledet" organization of the founders, who were immigrants to Mandate Palestine from Germany. In 1944 the community became a moshav shitufi named "Bnei Brit", named after the Bnai Brith organization in the United States which donated money for purchasing the land, in honor of their president Alfred Cohen. The place then changed its name to "Moledet-Bnei Brit" until in 1957 it finally reverted to just "Moledet."

References

Former kibbutzim
Moshavim
Populated places established in 1937
Populated places in Northern District (Israel)
1937 establishments in Mandatory Palestine
German-Jewish culture in Israel